A coffee table book, also known as a cocktail table book, is an oversized, usually hard-covered book whose purpose is for display on a table intended for use in an area in which one entertains guests and from which it can serve to inspire conversation or pass the time. Subject matter is predominantly non-fiction and pictorial (a photo-book). Pages consist mainly of photographs and illustrations, accompanied by captions and small blocks of text, as opposed to long prose. Since they are aimed at anyone who might pick up the book for a light read, the analysis inside is often more basic and with less jargon than other books on the subject. Because of this, the term "coffee table book" can be used pejoratively to indicate a superficial approach to the subject..

In the field of mathematics, a coffee table book is usually a notebook containing a number of mathematical problems and theorems contributed by a community meeting in a particular place, or connected by a common scientific interest. An example of this was the Scottish Book created by mathematicians at Lviv University in the 1930s and 1940s.

History 

 
The concept of a book intended essentially for display over perusal was mentioned by Michel de Montaigne in his 1581 essay "Upon Some Verses of Virgil": "I am vexed that my Essays only serve the ladies for a common movable, a book to lay in the parlor window..." Almost two centuries later, Laurence Sterne in his 1759 comic novel The Life and Opinions of Tristram Shandy, Gentleman advanced the more lighthearted view that "As my life and opinions are likely to make some noise in the world, and... be no less read than the Pilgrim's Progress itself- and, in the end, prove the very thing Montaigne dreaded his Essays should turn out, that is, a book for a parlour window..."

Beginning in the late 1940s, publisher Albert Skira and a few others, such as Cailler and Editions Tisné, Éditions Mazenod, and Harry N. Abrams, began producing large folio and quarto (4to) format art books, illustrated with tipped-in color plates, often for international markets that were significant in the development of coffee table books as known today.

David Brower is sometimes credited with inventing the modern coffee table book. While serving as executive director of the Sierra Club, he had the idea for a series of books that combined nature photography and writings on nature, with, as he put it, "a page size big enough to carry a given image’s dynamic. The eye must be required to move about within the boundaries of the image, not encompass it all in one glance." The first such book, This is the American Earth, with photographs by Ansel Adams and others and text by Nancy Newhall, was published in 1960; the series became known as the "Exhibit Format" series, with 20 titles eventually published.

The term "coffee table book" appeared in Arts Magazine in 1961, and in the title of The Coffee Table Book of Astrology, published in 1962.

They have also found uses in propaganda, such as a book on the life of East German leader Walter Ulbricht and another on Albanian leader Enver Hoxha.

As of 2011, Madonna's 1992 book Sex remained the most searched for out-of-print coffee table book.

In popular culture
Coffee table books have been featured in several areas of popular culture. 
 In the 1980s, British comedy duo Smith and Jones released The lavishly-tooled Smith and Jones Coffee Table Book — its cover was designed to look as if the book could double as a coffee table.
The 1987 comedy Throw Momma from the Train has a running joke about one of the character's attempts to write a "coffee table book", the book is a list of female celebrities he'd like to have sex with.
 In Alan Moore's 1988 graphic novel, Batman: The Killing Joke, after Barbara Gordon is shot and falls on the coffee table and smashing it, Joker implies that she thought she was a coffee table edition which is, according to him, a common psychological complaint amongst ex-librarians.
 The fifth season (1993–1994) of the sitcom Seinfeld included a story arc involving Kramer wanting to write a coffee table book about coffee tables which would have legs built into the back cover and coasters built into the front cover, so the book itself could be turned into a small coffee table. Elaine Benes, who worked for Pendant Publishing, did not think that Kramer's idea was any good, but her boss (Mr. Lippman) learned about it from Kramer himself and turned it into a book, much to Elaine's dumbfounded surprise and dismay.
 In the 2012 Family Guy episode "You Can't Do That on Television, Peter", Peter states that he, Joe Swanson and Glen Quagmire are making a coffee table book of lesbian butts in 1980s jeans.
 Late-night talk show Conan features a sketch called "Coffee Table Books That Didn't Sell", in which Conan O'Brien reviews several fake coffee table books with odd and nonsensical premises, such as Movie Stars With Their Eyes Pushed Closer Together.

See also
 
 
 Artist's book
 Livre d'art

Book sources

References

Books by type